Alexander's is a real estate investment trust that owns 7 properties in New York metropolitan area, including 731 Lexington Avenue, the headquarters of Bloomberg L.P. It is controlled by Vornado Realty Trust. It was founded by George Farkas and Louis Schwadron in 1928.

Before it filed for bankruptcy in 1992, Alexander's also operated a department store chain that included 16 stores at its peak. All but one of the stores (at the time of the 1992 bankruptcy) were located in buildings owned by the company. Locations included a store that occupied the entire block between East 58th and 59th streets and Lexington and Third Avenues in Manhattan (now the location of 731 Lexington Avenue), a store in The Mall at the World Trade Center, and a store in Paramus, New Jersey that featured one of the largest murals in the world.

History
In 1928, George Farkas, a Brooklyn native, opened a store on Third Avenue in the Bronx with $7,500 and named it for his deceased father, Alexander. Catering to the well-to-do middle class, the store offered discounted designer clothing and high-quality private label goods. Its advertising slogan at one time was "You'll find Alexander's has what you're looking for; how lucky can you get?!"

The chain thrived even during the Great Depression, and opened a location on Fordham Road and the Grand Concourse in The Bronx in 1933. At its heyday in the 1930s, this store was known for its discount bargains and had more sales per square foot than any other store in the United States.

Farkas was known for being a master at selecting locations for his stores, buying the real estate instead of leasing.

In February 1959, the company opened a store in Rego Park, Queens.

In 1963, the company opened its flagship store on 59th street in Manhattan after it bought the land from a company controlled by Joseph P. Kennedy Sr. for what seemed like a high price of $125 per square foot.

In December 1968, Alexander's became a public company via an initial public offering, raising $41.17 million, in part to prevent a takeover from competitor E. J. Korvette. Founder George Farkas retired that year due to failing health and one of his sons, Alexander S. Farkas, became CEO.

In the 1970s, customers defected to larger competitors such as Macy's and Bloomingdale's, and discount stores such as Kmart.

Upon completion of The Mall at the World Trade Center in 1974, Alexander's became its anchor store. The location occupied roughly 1/6 of the WTC's 500,000 square foot mall, the largest in New York City, and was located underneath 4 World Trade Center, immediately to the east of the south tower.

In 1980, after a proxy fight, Interstate Properties, controlled by Steven Roth, took control of the company, seeking to maximize the value of its real estate.

In 1981, management attempted to expand offerings beyond leisure apparel.

In 1984 at the request of Interstate Properties, then holding a 13% stake, Alexander Farkas resigned as CEO and was succeeded by his brother, Robin (1933-2018).

In 1986, Donald Trump bought approximately 20% of the company.

Closure and real estate business 
1987 was the last year in which the company made a profit from its retail operations.

In 1988, Interstate and Trump each raised their stakes to 27% of the company, but Trump pledged his interest as collateral for a personal loan from Citibank, and in 1991 was forced to turn over his holdings to the guarantor.

In 1992, Roth and creditors forced the company into bankruptcy and the company shut all  11 stores on May 15, 1992, laying off 5,000 people. The bankruptcy was also triggered by a put option Gruss family held to sell its 18% interest in the partnership that owned the 59th street store to Alexander's for $35 million and the company did not have the money.

In 1993, the company emerged from bankruptcy. The combination of an increase in value in its real estate holdings and shedding of its liabilities caused its stock to skyrocket from $8.50 per share before it declared bankruptcy to $57 per share a year later.

In 1995, Vornado Realty Trust bought the interest from Citicorp (formerly owned by Donald Trump) for $54.8 million.

In November 2012, the company sold the Kings Plaza mall in Brooklyn to Macerich for $751 million and used the proceeds to pay a $122 per share dividend to stockholders.

Mural at the Paramus store
One of the more famous things associated with Alexander’s was an abstract art mural painted on glass with enamel by Polish artist Stefan Knapp that was displayed on the outside of the Alexander’s location opposite Garden State Plaza in Paramus, New Jersey. The mural was hung on the side of the building facing New Jersey Route 4 and remained there until the building’s demolition in 1998.

George Farkas had approached artist Salvador Dalí to paint a mural for the Paramus location and the two had agreed to terms on a contract. However, sometime after that, Farkas was traveling abroad and came across a mural painted by Knapp while walking through London’s Heathrow Airport and decided to commission him to paint a mural as well. Dalí demanded that he do the piece, which would include giraffes with drawers suspended from their necks hanging out over the street, and was willing to let Knapp paint the giraffes. Farkas responded by giving the job to Knapp in its entirety, but still paid Dalí for his input. Knapp’s theme was a map of the world painted as he viewed it during his time as a pilot in the Royal Air Force after his emancipation from a Soviet prison camp.

When it was completed in 1963, the 280-panel mural was the largest in the world, measuring 200 feet by 50 feet and weighing over 250 tons. Farkas was enamored with the work and hired Knapp to paint murals at Valley Stream and White Plains stores.

The store was closed in 1992 and the building sat unused. In 1996, Steven Roth, the chairman of Vornado Realty Trust, announced that the store would be redeveloped into a shopping center anchored by Ikea. Will Roseman, mayor of nearby Carlstadt, New Jersey and a director of the Bergen Museum of Art & Science contacted Roth in an attempt to save the mural. After it was appraised by Sotheby's the mural was donated to the Bergen Museum of Art & Science, which stored it in a garage in Carlstadt.

In June 2015, pieces of the mural were displayed at the Art Factory in Paterson, New Jersey. However, Roseman held back 20 sections because he was worried that the Art Factory would sell the work. The sections were laid out in rows, with some having specific themes.

In September 2021, the directors of Valley Health System and the mayor of Paramus announced that they would be installing fifty pieces of the mural in various spots along the campus of the new Valley Hospital, which is being built in Paramus and scheduled to open in 2023.

References

External links

Companies based in Bergen County, New Jersey
Companies listed on the New York Stock Exchange
Defunct department stores based in New York City
Real estate investment trusts of the United States
Real estate companies established in 1928
Financial services companies established in 1928
Retail companies established in 1928
Retail companies disestablished in 1992
1960s initial public offerings
Defunct discount stores of the United States